The Ser-Drama-Lagadin-Nevrokop dialect is a dialect currently treated both in the contexts of the southeastern group of Bulgarian dialects and the southeastern subgroup of dialects of the Macedonian.
Prior to the codification of standard Macedonian in 1945, the dialects of Macedonia were classified as Bulgarian.
The Ser-Drama-Lagadin-Nevrokop dialect is closely related to the neighbouring dialects. It is closer to all Eastern Bulgarian dialects than to all Western. Macedonian shares much less features with the dialect than it does with the Maleševo-Pirin dialect of Macedonian and Bulgarian. Some Bulgarian dialects are more similar to Macedonian than the Ser-Nevrokop dialect, the Samokov dialect shares more features with Macedonian than both the Ser-Nevrokop and the Pirin-Malasevo dialects do, even though it is not considered a Macedonian dialect, the most of the western Bulgarian dialects and the Smolyan dialect share more similarities with Macedonian than the Ser dialect does. The Samokov dialect, most remarkably, shares with Macedonian and the Maleševo-Pirin dialect—the "to be" verb for future tense—"ke, which in contrast is "shte in the Ser-Nevrokop dialect and in the Bulgarian language. The Yat border passes through the Maleševo-Pirin dialect and divides it on such a way that in the northern area of the dialect the yat is pronounced "e (as in all the Western Bulgarian dialects and Macedonian) and in the south—"ya (as in the Eastern Bulgarian dialects and standard Bulgarian). In the Ser-Nevrokop dialect the yat is pronounced in most places "ya, therefore the city of Serres, after which the dialect is named, is called "Syar by the locals, as opposed to "Ser in Macedonian. The first person singular is as in Bulgarian, ending with "a or "am as opposed to the constant "am in Macedonian and the Bulgarian Smolyan dialect. The words for man -"m'zh and for a dream "s'n are as in Bulgarian, unlike the Macedonian "mazh and "son. The words for night and tear—"nosht and "s'lza are as the Bulgarian, unlike the Macedonian "nok and "solza.

The Serres-Nevrokop dialect is treated both in the contexts of Bulgarian and Macedonian dialectology. As described in the section about its range, the vast majority of its speakers identify as Bulgarians. In the context of Bulgarian dialectology, the dialect is situated East of the Yat boundary and thus is considered to belong to the Eastern Bulgarian dialects, more exactly to the Rup subgroup

The previous range of the dialect included vast areas of northeastern Greece, in what is today known as Eastern Macedonia and Thrace. However, considering the mass migration towards Bulgaria in the period from 1912 to 1926, it is unclear to what extent, and if at all, the dialect is preserved in Greece. The only certain region where it is currently spoken is the southeastern quarter of Pirin Macedonia, i.e. in the town of Gotse Delchev and the surrounding municipalities.

Relationship to standard Bulgarian and standard Macedonian
The Serres-Nevrokop dialect possesses features (cf. table) which are typical for the Eastern Bulgarian dialects, including я/е (/) reflexes of Old Church Slavonic ѣ, щ/жд (/) reflexes of Proto-Slavic /, ъ reflex of Old Church Slavonic ѫ (yus) and ъ, ръ/лъ reflexes of Old Church Slavonic ръ/рь and лъ/ль, retention of h in the stem, strong vowel reduction, etc. and none of those typical for Macedonian. The following is a table of the main phonological and grammatical features which differentiate standard Bulgarian and standard Macedonian, compared with the corresponding features of the Serres-Nevrokop dialect, as well as two Western Bulgarian dialects.

Past and present range, emigration and expulsion to Bulgaria
Before the Balkan wars, the range of the Serres-Nevrokop dialect was estimated to include the regions of Serres, Drama, Nevrokop and a small part of the Thessaloniki region. This range included approx. 170,000 speakers on the territory of modern Greece (150,000 Christian and 20,000 Muslim Bulgarians or Pomaks) and 25,000 speakers on the territory of modern Bulgaria (10,000 Christians and 15,000 Muslims). However, Kanchov indicates that at least some of these were bilingual and subject to strong Hellenization, including the Slavic population of the towns of Drama, Serres, Lagkadas, as well as of several villages around Lagadina. There was substantial emigration towards Bulgaria even before the Balkan wars, approx. 50,000 Bulgarians from Macedonia lived in Bulgaria in 1900; however, there is no data as to how many of these came from the regions identified above.

The region suffered heavy devastation during the Second Balkan War. A total of 260 Bulgarian villages in the regions of Drama and Serres were set on fire by the advancing Greek troops, with their inhabitants either slaughtered or expelled to Bulgaria. By the end of 1913, Bulgaria had received approx. 50,000 refugees from Greek Macedonia, the vast majority of them from the most affected regions of Kilkis, Serres and Drama. Emigration continued in 1914 and during and after World War I. Additional 60,000 to 90,000 Bulgarians from Greek Macedonia (out of 90,000 to 120,000 people, 32,000 of which were from Western Thrace) emigrated to Bulgaria at the beginning of the 1920s according to the Mollov-Kafandaris Agreement.

Thus, refugees from Greek Macedonia comprised at least 110,000 to 140,000 of the 250,000 officially registered Bulgarian refugees between 1912 and 1916, or slightly more than a third to slightly less than half of the pre-war Christian Bulgarian (referred to as ethnic Macedonian in the Republic of Macedonia) population of Greek Macedonia identified at approx. 320,000 by Kanchov. Considering that the number of refugees from Eastern Thrace and Western Thrace was approx. 50,000 and slightly more than 30,000, respectively, and that there were no mass expulsions from Serbian Macedonia and Southern Dobruja, the number of refugees from Greek Macedonia was probably higher. Furthermore, the data from the Bulgarian refugee agency includes only officially registered refugees and omits people who did not register as such.

According to Hugh Poulton, the patterns of migration to Bulgaria differed across the different parts of Greek Macedonia. The majority of the Slavs roughly East of the Vardar (including the region where the Serres-Nevrokop dialect was spoken) either fled or, later, immigrated to Bulgaria, whereas the majority of the Slavs West of Vardar remained in Greece and only a minority resettled to Bulgaria. The large-scale migration is corroborated by the data collected during the Bulgarian occupation of northeastern Greece during World War II.

The Bulgarian authorities counted only 37,000 Bulgarians during the 1941 census in the Bulgarian-occupied zone (which practically coincided with the range of the Serres-Nevrokop dialect), even including bilingual persons and returnees from Bulgaria, down from more than 170,000 before the Balkan Wars. According to the Bulgarian statistics, of approx. 698,000 Bulgarians who immigrated to Bulgaria from 1878 to 1945, 200,000 came from Greek Macedonia, which is equal to between half and two-thirds of the Slavic population of Greek Macedonia before the Balkan Wars. As evidenced above, the vast majority of the refugees and migrants came from the eastern part of Greek Macedonia.

Considering the above, as well as the strong Greek assimilation pressure, evident also before the Balkan Wars, it is generally unlikely for the Serres-Nevrokop dialect to be preserved in any significant numbers in its former territory in Greece. Thus, the only certain present range is in the southeastern part of Pirin Macedonia, as well as among descendants of refugees from the region in other parts of Bulgaria. The overwhelming majority of the speakers of the dialect in Pirin Macedonia identify as Bulgarians, while less than 1.0% of the population of the region (only region-wide data available) identify as ethnic Macedonians.

References

Dialects of the Bulgarian language
Dialects of the Macedonian language